Mahathala ariadeva, the Malayan Falcate Oakblue, is a butterfly in the family Lycaenidae. It was described by Hans Fruhstorfer in 1908. It is found in the Indomalayan realm.

Subspecies
 Mahathala ariadeva ariadeva (Peninsular Malaysia, Sumatra)
 Mahathala ariadeva burmana Talbot, 1942 (Burma, Thailand)

References

External links
Mahathala at Markku Savela's Lepidoptera and Some Other Life Forms

Mahathala
Butterflies described in 1908